RollerSoccer, Futins, Football Skating, Roller Foot or roller football is a version of association football (soccer) played on roller skates.

History 
The sport was created in the English Midlands in 1882 and the first documented match was a game between local rivals Derby and Burton on 30 January of that year. A 1934 game at London's Forest Gate Roller Rink, between two teams of female players, was filmed for an item on Pathé News. Over a decade later Billboard reported in 1949 that it had been revived in Detroit, having disappeared for more than thirty years.

The game re-emerged serendipitously in San Francisco in 1995, when a soccer ball rolled into the street while Zack Phillips was inline skating. He instinctively kicked the ball with his skates and immediately envisioned sporting potential. Later that day he brought his own soccer ball to his group of inline skate friends who had previously kicked pine cones while skating.  In 1996 Zack established the RollerSoccer International Federation and launched a website and with the help of skate friends. By 1998, it was described as "well established in some areas". In the early 2000's the Futins (Futebol de Patins) organization established by Almir Falcão in Pernambuco, Brazil connected with the RollerSoccer organization.

The first RollerSoccer World Cup was held in London in 2003 and again in 2004 whereafter the tournament was rotated around the world with European and National events also emerging. Fourteen (14) RollerSoccer World Cups or Club World Cups were held through 2019. Post-COVID the world championships are resuming as the Football Skating World Cup 8-18 December in Trabzon, Turkey and a Club World Cup during 2023.

The country with most active players and the highest number of teams is France, with UMS Easy Riders currently the defending Club World Cup Champion. Skaters on inline and roller skates on every continent (except Antartica) have played soccer/football on skates. Australia and Belgium have interesting history. African and Asian teams have been emerging for many years.

World championships 
 2003 (London) : 
 1st Holland 
 2nd Germany  
 2004 (London) : 
 1st Germany 
 2nd Holland 
 2005 (Germany) : 
 1st Germany 
2006 (Nuremberg) : 
 1st Planet Roller 
 2nd AMSCAS Marseille  
 2007 (Paris) : 
 1st AMSCAS Marseille  
 ??
 3rd Planet Roller 
 ??
 5th UTOPIE Toulon 
 2008 (San Francisco) : 
 1st Away Team 
 2nd AMSCAS Marseille 
 3rd Euroland  
 4th Planet Roller 
 2009 (Brussels) : 
 1st AMSCAS Marseille 
 2nd Shark Épinay Roller Soccer 
 3rd Planet Roller  
 4th UTOPIE Toulon 
 2010 (Piacenza): 
 1st AMSCAS Marseille  
 2011 (Recife) : 
 1st AMSCAS Marseille  
 2nd Sport Clube Recife  
 3rd Recife Futins Clube  
 2012 (Marseille) : 
 1st AMSCAS Marseille 
 2nd Rollera Ljubljana 
 3rd Recife Futins Clube 
 4th Shark Épinay Roller Soccer 
 2013 (Amsterdam) :
 1st AMSCAS Marseille 
 2nd RSCT Toulon 
 3rd Phénix, Marseille 
 4th Paris RF 
 2015 (Toulon) :
 1st RSCT Toulon 
 2nd Phenix Marseille 
 Semi finalists: Rollera Ljubljana , AMSCAS Marseille 
 2017 (Marseille) :
 1st Phénix, Marseille 
 2nd UMS Easy Riders Pontault-Combault 
 3rd AMSCAS Marseille 
 4th RSCT Toulon 
 2019 (Brussels) :
 1st UMS Easy Riders Pontault-Combault 
 2nd Roller Holland Amsterdam 
 3rd Shinobis Riders Brussels 
 4th Phénix, Marseille 
 2022 (Turkey) :
 8-18 December 2022 Trabzon, Turkey

References

External links
 The Official Rollersoccer International Federation
 The Official London Rollersoccer page

Association football variants
Inline skating
Roller sports